J. Satyanarayana (IAST: J. Satyanārāyaṇa) (born 16 April 1954) is a retired 1977 batch Indian Administrative Service officer of Andhra Pradesh cadre. Satyanarayana is the current Chairman of Unique Identification Authority of India (UIDAI), the nodal agency of Government of India for implementing Aadhaar. He also served as the Communications and Information Technology Secretary of India.

Education 
J. Satyanarayana has a graduate degree (BSc) in Mathematics, and is a postgraduate (MSc) in Physics. Satyanarayana also holds an MBA degree from the University of Ljubljana.

Career

As an IAS officer 
J. Satyanarayana served in key positions for both the Union Government and the Government of Andhra Pradesh, like as the Chief Commissioner of Land Administration (CCLA) of Andhra Pradesh, Special Chief Secretary (Health, Medical and Family Welfare), Special Chief Secretary to the Chief Minister of Andhra Pradesh, Principal Secretary (Communications and Information Technology), Principal Secretary (Social Welfare), Commissioner and Inspector General (Registration), Managing Director of Distilleries and Breweries, Special Secretary to Government Finance Department and as the District Magistrate and Collector of Anantapur, Karimnagar and Kurnool districts in the Andhra Pradesh Government, and as the Union Communications and Information Technology Secretary in the Union Government.

J. Satyanarayana also had stint with the National Institute for Smart Government (NISG), on deputation, as its Chief Executive Officer (CEO), under Rule 6(2)(ii) of The Indian Administrative Service (Cadre) Rules, 1954.

Electronics and Information Technology Secretary 

J. Satyanarayana was appointed as the Union Communications and Information Technology Secretary by the Appointments Committee of the Cabinet (ACC), he assumed office on 14 March 2012, and demitted it and simultaneously superannuated from service on 31 April 2014.

Post-retirement

Adviser to Government of Andhra Pradesh 
Post-retirement, J. Satyanarayana was appointed as the Adviser to the Government of Andhra Pradesh for e-Governance, Electronics and Information Technology, with the status of a Cabinet Minister. He tendered his resignation to the Chief Secretary of Andhra Pradesh on 3 September 2016.

Chairman of UIDAI 
J. Satyanarayana was appointed as the Chairman of Unique Identification Authority of India (UIDAI) by the Appointments Committee of the Cabinet (ACC), He assumed the office of Chairman on 8 September 2016.

Works

References

External links 
 Executive Record Sheet as maintained by Department of Personnel and Training of Government of India
 Executive Profile at Bloomberg
 Profile at National Institute for Smart Government's website

1954 births
Living people
Indian Administrative Service officers
Scientists from Andhra Pradesh
People from Andhra Pradesh
University of Ljubljana alumni